The Crystal Brook is an ephemeral  stream located in the Mid North region of the Australian state of South Australia.

Course and features
The stream was named in 1839 by the explorer Edward John Eyre for its clear water. Eyre is recorded as saying that it "so forcibly reminded me of the beautiful bubbling brooks at home (England) that I at once named it the Chrystal Brook".

At Bowman Park there is a permanent spring, and this is probably the 'Crystal' water that Eyre was referring to when he named the stream. The brook only flows for its whole length following exceptional rains or a wetter than usual winter or spring.

See also

References

Rivers of South Australia
Mid North (South Australia)